Elati, may refer to several villages and a mountain in Greece:

 Elati (mountain), a mountain in the heart of the island of Lefkada
 Elati, Arcadia, a settlement in Arcadia 
 Elati, Arta, a settlement in the Arta regional unit
 Elati, Ioannina, a settlement in the Ioannina regional unit
 Elati, Kozani, a village in the Kozani regional unit
 Elati, Trikala, a village in the Trikala regional unit
 Elate, a Greek mythological woman

See also
Elatia (disambiguation)